The 2017 Rice Owls football team represented Rice University in the 2017 NCAA Division I FBS football season. The Owls played their home games at the Rice Stadium in Houston, Texas, and competed in the West Division of Conference USA (C–USA). They were led by eleventh-year head coach David Bailiff. They finished the season 1–11, 1–7 in C-USA play to finish in sixth place in the West Division.

On November 27, head coach David Bailiff was fired. He finished at Rice with an 11-year record of 57–80.

Schedule
Rice announced its 2017 football schedule on January 26, 2017. The 2017 schedule consisted of 5 home, 6 away and 1 neutral site game in the regular season. The Owls hosted CUSA foes FIU, Louisiana Tech, North Texas, and Southern Miss, and traveled to Old Dominion, UAB, UTEP, and UTSA

The Owls hosted one of the four non-conference opponents, Army, who was independent from a conference, and traveled to Houston from the American Athletic Conference and Pittsburgh from the Atlantic Coast Conference. Rice traveled to Sydney, Australia to face Stanford from the Pac-12 Conference.

Schedule Source:

Game summaries

vs Stanford

at UTEP

at Houston

FIU

at Pittsburgh

Army

at UTSA

Louisiana Tech

at UAB

Southern Miss

at Old Dominion

North Texas

References

Rice
Rice Owls football seasons
Rice Owls football